Orthostoma abdominale is a species of beetle in the family Cerambycidae. It was described by Gyllenhal in 1817.

References

Compsocerini
Beetles described in 1817